The 2004 Norwich City Council election took place on 10 June 2004 to elect members of Norwich City Council in England. This was on the same day as other local elections. This was the first election to be held under new ward boundaries, which reduced the number of seats from 48 to 39. As a result, all seats were up for election. The Liberal Democrats lost overall control of the council, which fell under no overall control.

Results summary

Ward results

Bowthorpe

Catton Grove

Crome

Eaton

Lakenham

Mancroft

Mile Cross

Nelson

Sewell

NOTW = Norwich Over The Water

Thorpe Hamlet

Town Close

University

Wensum

References 

Norwich
Norwich City Council elections
2000s in Norfolk